Elton is a rural locality (a settlement) and the administrative center of Eltonskoye Rural Settlement, Pallasovsky District, Volgograd Oblast, Russia. The population was 2,723 as of 2010. There are 47 streets.

Geography 
Elton is located on the Caspian Depression, 113 km south of Pallasovka (the district's administrative centre) by road. Zhanibek is the nearest rural locality.

References 

Rural localities in Pallasovsky District